

Events

Pre-1600
1500 – Portuguese navigator Pedro Álvares Cabral lands in Brazil.
1519 – Spanish conquistador Hernán Cortés establishes a settlement at Veracruz, Mexico.
1529 – Treaty of Zaragoza divides the eastern hemisphere between Spain and Portugal along a line 297.5 leagues east of the Moluccas.

1601–1900
1809 – The second day of the Battle of Eckmühl: The Austrian army is defeated by the First French Empire army led by Napoleon and driven over the Danube in Regensburg.
1836 – Texas Revolution: A day after the Battle of San Jacinto, forces under Texas General Sam Houston identify Mexican General Antonio López de Santa Anna among the captives of the battle when some of his fellow soldiers mistakenly give away his identity.
1864 – The U.S. Congress passes the Coinage Act of 1864 that permitted the inscription In God We Trust be placed on all coins minted as United States currency.
1876 – The first National League baseball game is played at the Jefferson Street Grounds in Philadelphia.
1889 – At noon, thousands rush to claim land in the Land Rush of 1889. Within hours the cities of Oklahoma City and Guthrie are formed with populations of at least 10,000.
1898 – Spanish–American War: President William McKinley calls for 125,000 volunteers to join the National Guard and fight in Cuba, while Congress more than doubles regular Army forces to 65,000.

1901–present
1906 – The 1906 Intercalated Games open in Athens.
1915 – World War I: The use of poison gas in World War I escalates when chlorine gas is released as a chemical weapon in the Second Battle of Ypres.
1930 – The United Kingdom, Japan and the United States sign the London Naval Treaty regulating submarine warfare and limiting shipbuilding.
1944 – The 1st Air Commando Group using Sikorsky R-4 helicopters stage the first use of helicopters in combat with combat search and rescue operations in the China Burma India Theater.
  1944   – World War II: Operation Persecution is initiated: Allied forces land in the Hollandia (currently known as Jayapura) area of New Guinea.
  1944   – World War II: In Greenland, the Allied Sledge Patrol attack the German Bassgeiger weather station.
1945 – World War II: Prisoners at the Jasenovac concentration camp revolt. Five hundred twenty are killed and around eighty escape.
  1945   – World War II: Sachsenhausen concentration camp is liberated by soldiers of the Red Army and Polish First Army.
1948 – Arab–Israeli War: The port city of Haifa is captured by Jewish forces.
1951 – Korean War: The Chinese People's Volunteer Army begin assaulting positions defended by the Royal Australian Regiment and the Princess Patricia's Canadian Light Infantry at the Battle of Kapyong.
1954 – Red Scare: Witnesses begin testifying and live television coverage of the Army–McCarthy hearings begins.
1969 – British yachtsman Sir Robin Knox-Johnston wins the Sunday Times Golden Globe Race and completes the first solo non-stop circumnavigation of the world.
  1969   – The formation of the Communist Party of India (Marxist-Leninist) is announced at a mass rally in Calcutta.
1970 – The first Earth Day is celebrated.
1974 – Pan Am Flight 812 crashes on approach to Ngurah Rai International Airport in Denpasar, Bali, Indonesia, killing all 107 people on board.
1977 – Optical fiber is first used to carry live telephone traffic.
1992 – A series of gas explosions rip through the streets in Guadalajara, Mexico, killing 206.
1993 – Eighteen-year-old Stephen Lawrence is murdered in a racially motivated attack while waiting for a bus in Well Hall, Eltham.
2005 – Japan's Prime Minister Junichiro Koizumi apologizes for Japan's war record.
2016 – The Paris Agreement is signed, an agreement to help fight global warming.
2020 – Four police officers are killed after being struck by a truck on the Eastern Freeway in Melbourne while speaking to a speeding driver, marking the largest loss of police lives in Victoria Police history.

Births

Pre-1600
1412 – Reinhard III, Count of Hanau (1451–1452) (d. 1452)
1444 – Elizabeth of York, Duchess of Suffolk (d. 1503)
1451 – Isabella I of Castile (d. 1504)
1518 – Antoine of Navarre (d. 1562)
1592 – Wilhelm Schickard, German astronomer and mathematician (d. 1635)

1601–1900
1610 – Pope Alexander VIII (d. 1691)
1658 – Giuseppe Torelli, Italian violinist and composer (d. 1709)
1690 – John Carteret, 2nd Earl Granville, English politician, Lord President of the Council (d. 1763)
1707 – Henry Fielding, English novelist and playwright (d. 1754)
1711 – Paul II Anton, Prince Esterházy, Austrian soldier (d. 1762)
1724 – Immanuel Kant, German anthropologist, philosopher, and academic (d. 1804)
1732 – John Johnson, English architect and surveyor (d. 1814)
1744 – James Sullivan, American lawyer and politician, 7th Governor of Massachusetts (d. 1808)
1766 – Germaine de Staël, French author and political philosopher (d. 1817)
1812 – Solomon Caesar Malan, Swiss-English orientalist (d. 1894)
1816 – Charles-Denis Bourbaki, French general (d. 1897)
1830 – Emily Davies, British suffragist and educator, co-founder and an early Mistress of Girton College, Cambridge University
1832 – Julius Sterling Morton, American journalist and politician, 3rd United States Secretary of Agriculture (d. 1902)
1844 – Lewis Powell, American soldier, attempted assassin of William H. Seward (d. 1865)
1852 – William IV, Grand Duke of Luxembourg (d. 1912)
1854 – Henri La Fontaine, Belgian lawyer and author, Nobel Prize laureate (d. 1943)
1858 – Ethel Smyth, English composer (d. 1944)
  1858   – Fritz Mayer van den Bergh, Belgian art collector and art historian (d. 1901)
1870 – Vladimir Lenin, Russian revolutionary and founder of Soviet Russia (d. 1924)
1872 – Princess Margaret of Prussia (d. 1954)
1873 – Ellen Glasgow, American author (d. 1945)
1874 – Wu Peifu, Chinese warlord, politician, and marshal of the Beiyang Army (d. 1939)
1876 – Róbert Bárány, Austrian-Swedish otologist and physician, Nobel Prize laureate (d. 1936)
  1876   – Georg Lurich, Estonian wrestler and strongman (d. 1920)
1879 – Bernhard Gregory, Estonian-German chess player (d. 1939)
1884 – Otto Rank, Austrian-American psychologist and academic (d. 1939)
1886 – Izidor Cankar, Slovenian historian, author, and diplomat (d. 1958)
1887 – Harald Bohr, Danish mathematician and footballer (d. 1951)
1889 – Richard Glücks, German SS officer (d. 1945)
1891 – Laura Gilpin, American photographer (d. 1979)
  1891   – Vittorio Jano, Italian engineer (d. 1965)
  1891   – Harold Jeffreys, English mathematician, geophysicist, and astronomer (d. 1989)
  1891   – Nicola Sacco, Italian-American anarchist (d. 1927)
1892 – Vernon Johns, African-American minister and activist (d. 1965)
1899 – Vladimir Nabokov, Russian-born novelist and critic (d. 1977)
1900 – Nellie Beer, British politician, Lord Mayor of Manchester from 1966 to 1967 (d. 1988)

1901–present
1904 – J. Robert Oppenheimer, American physicist and academic (d. 1967)
1905 – Robert Choquette, American-Canadian author, poet, and diplomat (d. 1991)
1906 – Eric Fenby, English composer and educator (d. 1997)
  1906   – Prince Gustaf Adolf, Duke of Västerbotten (d. 1947)
1909 – Rita Levi-Montalcini, Italian neurologist and academic, Nobel Prize laureate (d. 2012)
  1909   – Indro Montanelli, Italian journalist and historian (d. 2001)
  1909   – Spyros Markezinis, Greek politician, Prime Minister of Greece (d. 2000)
1910 – Norman Steenrod, American mathematician and academic (d. 1971)
1912 – Kathleen Ferrier, English operatic singer (d. 1953)
  1912   – Kaneto Shindo, Japanese director, producer, and screenwriter (d. 2012)
1914 – Baldev Raj Chopra, Indian director and producer (d. 2008)
  1914   – Jan de Hartog, Dutch-American author and playwright (d. 2002)
  1914   – José Quiñones Gonzales, Peruvian soldier and pilot (d. 1941)
  1914   – Michael Wittmann, German SS officer (d. 1944)
1916 – Hanfried Lenz, German mathematician and academic (d. 2013)
  1916   – Yehudi Menuhin, American-Swiss violinist and conductor (d. 1999)
1917 – Yvette Chauviré, French ballerina (d. 2016)
  1917   – Sidney Nolan, Australian painter (d. 1992) 
1918 – William Jay Smith, American poet and academic (d. 2015)
  1918   – Mickey Vernon, American baseball player and coach (d. 2008)
1919 – Donald J. Cram, American chemist and academic, Nobel Prize laureate (d. 2001)
  1919   – Carl Lindner, Jr., American businessman and philanthropist (d. 2011)
1922 – Richard Diebenkorn, American soldier and painter (d. 1993)
  1922   – Charles Mingus, American bassist, composer, and bandleader (d. 1979)
  1922   – Wolf V. Vishniac, American microbiologist and academic (d. 1973)
1923 – Peter Kane Dufault, American soldier, pilot, and poet (d. 2013)
  1923   – Bettie Page, American model and actress (d. 2008)
  1923   – Aaron Spelling, American actor, producer, and screenwriter (d. 2006)
1924 – Nam Duck-woo, South Korean politician, 12th Prime Minister of South Korea (d. 2013)
1926 – Charlotte Rae, American actress and singer (d. 2018)
  1926   – James Stirling, Scottish architect, designed the Staatsgalerie Stuttgart and Seeley Historical Library (d. 1992)
1927 – Laurel Aitken, Cuban-Jamaican singer (d. 2005)
1928 – Estelle Harris, American actress and comedian (d. 2022)
1929 – Michael Atiyah, English-Lebanese mathematician and academic (d. 2019)
  1929   – Robert Wade-Gery, English diplomat, British High Commissioner to India (d. 2015)
1930 – Enno Penno, Estonian politician, Prime Minister of Estonia in exile (d. 2016)
1931 – John Buchanan, Canadian lawyer and politician, 20th Premier of Nova Scotia (d. 2019)
  1931   – Ronald Hynd, English dancer and choreographer
1933 – Anthony Llewellyn, Welsh-American chemist and astronaut (d. 2013)
1935 – Christopher Ball, English linguist and academic
  1935   – Paul Chambers, African-American bassist and composer (d. 1969)
  1935   – Bhama Srinivasan, Indian-American mathematician and academic
1936 – Glen Campbell, American singer-songwriter, guitarist, and actor (d. 2017)
  1936   – Pierre Hétu, Canadian pianist and conductor (d. 1998)
1937 – Jack Nicholson, American actor and producer
  1937   – Jack Nitzsche, American singer-songwriter, pianist, and conductor (d. 2000)
1938 – Alan Bond, English-Australian businessman (d. 2015)
  1938   – Gani Fawehinmi, Nigerian lawyer and activist (d. 2009)
  1938   – Issey Miyake, Japanese fashion designer (d. 2022)
  1938   – Adam Raphael, English journalist and author
1939 – Mel Carter, American singer and actor 
  1939   – John Foley, English general and politician, Lieutenant Governor of Guernsey
  1939   – Ray Guy, Canadian journalist and author (d. 2013)
  1939   – Jason Miller, American actor and playwright (d. 2001)
  1939   – Theodor Waigel, German lawyer and politician, German Federal Minister of Finance
1941 – Greville Howard, Baron Howard of Rising, English politician
1942 – Giorgio Agamben, Italian philosopher and academic
  1942   – Mary Prior, English politician, Lord Lieutenant of Bristol
1943 – Keith Crisco, American businessman and politician (d. 2014)
  1943   – Janet Evanovich, American author
  1943   – Louise Glück, American poet
  1943   – John Maples, Baron Maples, English lawyer and politician, Shadow Secretary of State for Defence (d. 2012)
  1943   – Scott W. Williams, American mathematician and professor
1944 – Steve Fossett, American businessman, pilot, and sailor (d. 2007)
  1944   – Doug Jarrett, Canadian ice hockey player (d. 2014)
  1944   – Joshua Rifkin, American conductor and musicologist
1945 – Gopalkrishna Gandhi, Indian civil servant and politician, 22nd Governor of West Bengal
  1945   – Demetrio Stratos, Greek-Egyptian singer-songwriter (d. 1979)
1946 – Steven L. Bennett, American captain and pilot, Medal of Honor recipient (d. 1972)
  1946   – Paul Davies, English physicist and author
  1946   – Louise Harel, Canadian lawyer and politician
  1946   – Archy Kirkwood, Baron Kirkwood of Kirkhope, Scottish lawyer and politician
  1946   – Nicholas Stern, Baron Stern of Brentford, English economist and academic
  1946   – John Waters, American actor, director, producer, and screenwriter
1948 – John Pritchard, English bishop
1949 – Spencer Haywood, American basketball player
1950 – Peter Frampton, English singer-songwriter, guitarist, and producer 
  1950   – Jancis Robinson, English journalist and critic
1951 – Aivars Kalējs, Latvian organist, composer, and pianist
  1951   – Ana María Shua, Argentinian author and poet
1957 – Donald Tusk, Polish journalist and politician, 14th Prime Minister of Poland
1960 – Mart Laar, Estonian historian and politician, 9th Prime Minister of Estonia
1961 – Alo Mattiisen, Estonian composer (d. 1996)
1962 – Jeff Minter, British video game designer and programmer
  1962   – Danièle Sauvageau, Canadian ice hockey player and coach
1963 – Rosalind Gill, English sociologist and academic
  1963   – Sean Lock, English comedian and actor (d. 2021)
1966 – Mickey Morandini, American baseball player and manager
1967 – David J. C. MacKay, English physicist, engineer, and academic (d. 2016)
1970 – Regine Velasquez, Filipino singer and actress
1976 – Dan Cloutier, Canadian ice hockey player and coach
1978 – Paul Malakwen Kosgei, Kenyan runner and coach
1979 – Zoltán Gera, Hungarian international footballer and manager
  1979   – Daniel Johns, Australian singer-songwriter and guitarist 
1980 – Quincy Timberlake, Kenyan-Australian activist, engineer, and politician
1982 – Kaká, Brazilian footballer
1983 – Sam W. Heads, English-American entomologist and palaeontologist
  1983   – Shkëlzen Shala, Albanian entrepreneur and veganism activist
1990 – Machine Gun Kelly, American rapper, singer, songwriter, actor
1991 – Danni Wyatt, English cricketer

Deaths

Pre-1600
 296 – Pope Caius
 536 – Pope Agapetus I
 591 – Peter III of Raqqa
 613 – Saint Theodore of Sykeon
 835 – Kūkai, Japanese Buddhist monk, founder of Esoteric (Shingon) Buddhism (b. 774)
 846 – Wuzong, Chinese emperor (b. 814)
1208 – Philip of Poitou, Prince-Bishop of Durham
1322 – Francis of Fabriano, Italian writer (b. 1251)
1355 – Eleanor of Woodstock, countess regent of Guelders, eldest daughter of King Edward II of England (b. 1318)
1585 – Henry of Saxe-Lauenburg, Prince-Archbishop of Bremen, Prince-Bishop of Osnabrück and Paderborn (b. 1550)

1601–1900
1616 – Miguel de Cervantes, Spanish novelist, poet, and playwright (b. 1547)
1672 – Georg Stiernhielm, Swedish linguist and poet (b. 1598)
1699 – Hans Erasmus Aßmann, German poet (b. 1646)
1758 – Antoine de Jussieu, French botanist and physician (b. 1686) 
1778 – James Hargreaves, British inventor (b. 1720) 
1806 – Pierre-Charles Villeneuve, French admiral (b. 1763)
1821 – Gregory V of Constantinople, Greek patriarch and saint (b. 1746)
1833 – Richard Trevithick, English engineer and explorer (b. 1771)
1850 – Friedrich Robert Faehlmann, Estonian philologist and physician (b. 1798)
1854 – Nicolás Bravo, Mexican general and politician, 11th President of Mexico (b. 1786)
1871 – Martín Carrera, Mexican general and president (1855) (b. 1806)
1877 – James P. Kirkwood, Scottish-American engineer (b. 1807)
1892 – Édouard Lalo, French violinist and composer (b. 1823)
1893 – Chaim Aronson, Lithuanian businessman and author (b. 1825)
1894 – Kostas Krystallis, Greek author and poet (b. 1868)
1896 – Thomas Meik, English engineer, founded Halcrow Group (b. 1812)

1901–present
1908 – Henry Campbell-Bannerman, Prime Minister of the United Kingdom (b. 1836)
1925 – André Caplet, French composer and conductor (b. 1878)
1929 – Henry Lerolle, French painter and art collector (b. 1848)
1932 – Ferenc Oslay, Hungarian-Slovene historian and author (b. 1883)
1933 – Henry Royce, English engineer and businessman, co-founded Rolls-Royce Limited (b. 1863)
1945 – Wilhelm Cauer, German mathematician and academic (b. 1900)
  1945   – Käthe Kollwitz, German painter and sculptor (b. 1867)
1950 – Charles Hamilton Houston, American lawyer and academic (b. 1895)
1951 – Horace Donisthorpe, English myrmecologist and coleopterist (b. 1870)
1978 – Will Geer, American actor (b. 1902)
1980 – Jane Froman, American actress and singer (b. 1907)
  1980   – Fritz Strassmann, German chemist and physicist (b. 1902)
1983 – Earl Hines, American pianist and bandleader (b. 1903)
1984 – Ansel Adams, American photographer and environmentalist (b. 1902)
1985 – Paul Hugh Emmett, American chemist and academic (b. 1900)
  1985   – Jacques Ferron, Canadian physician and author (b. 1921)
1986 – Mircea Eliade, Romanian historian and author (b. 1907)
1987 – Erika Nõva, Estonian architect (b. 1905)
1988 – Grigori Kuzmin, Russian-Estonian astronomer and academic (b. 1917)
  1988   – Irene Rich, American actress (b. 1891)
1989 – Emilio G. Segrè, Italian-American physicist and academic, Nobel Prize laureate (b. 1905)
1990 – Albert Salmi, American actor (b. 1928)
1994 – Richard Nixon, 37th President of the United States (b. 1913)
1995 – Jane Kenyon, American poet and author (b. 1947)
1996 – Erma Bombeck, American journalist and author (b. 1927)
  1996   – Jug McSpaden, American golfer and architect (b. 1908)
1999 – Munir Ahmad Khan, Pakistani nuclear engineer (b. 1926)
2003 – Felice Bryant, American songwriter (b. 1925)
2005 – Erika Fuchs, German translator (b. 1906)
  2005   – Philip Morrison, American physicist and academic (b. 1915)
  2005   – Eduardo Paolozzi, Scottish sculptor and artist (b. 1924)
2006 – Henriette Avram, American computer scientist and academic (b. 1919)
  2006   – Alida Valli, Italian actress (b. 1921)
2007 – Juanita Millender-McDonald, American educator and politician (b. 1938)
2009 – Jack Cardiff, British cinematographer, director and photographer (b. 1914)
2010 – Richard Barrett, American lawyer and activist (b. 1943)
2012 – George Rathmann, American chemist, biologist, and businessman (b. 1927)
2013 – Richie Havens, American singer-songwriter and guitarist (b. 1941)
  2013   – Lalgudi Jayaraman, Indian violinist and composer (b. 1930)
  2013   – Robert Suderburg, American pianist, composer, and conductor (b. 1936)
2014 – Oswaldo Vigas, Venezuelan painter (b. 1926)
2015 – Dick Balharry, Scottish environmentalist and photographer (b. 1937)
2017 – Donna Leanne Williams, Australian writer, artist, and activist (b. 1963)
2020 – Shirley Knight, American actress (b. 1936)
2021 – Adrian Garrett, American professional baseball player (b. 1943)
2022 – Guy Lafleur, Canadian ice hockey player (b. 1951)

Holidays and observances
 Christian feast day:
Acepsimas of Hnaita and companions (Catholic Church)
Arwald
Epipodius and Alexander
Hudson Stuck (Episcopal Church)
John Muir (Episcopal Church)
Opportuna of Montreuil
Pope Caius
Pope Soter
St Senorina
April 22 (Eastern Orthodox liturgics)
Fighter Aviation Day (Brazil) 
Discovery Day (Brazil)
Earth Day (International observance) and its related observance: International Mother Earth Day
Holocaust Remembrance Day (Serbia)
From 2018 onwards, a national day of commemoration for the murdered teenager Stephen Lawrence (United Kingdom)

References

External links

 BBC: On This Day
 
 Historical Events on April 22

Days of the year
April